Santiago District may refer to:
 Santiago District, Palmares, Alajuela Province, Costa Rica
 Santiago District, San Ramón, Alajuela Province, Costa Rica
 Santiago District, Puriscal, San José Province, Costa Rica
 Santiago District, San Rafael, Heredia Province, Costa Rica
 Santiago District, Paraíso, Cartago Province, Costa Rica
 Santiago District, Veraguas, Panama
 Santiago District, Paraguay, Misiones Department
 Santiago District, Cusco, Peru
 Santiago District, Ica, Peru

See also
 Río Santiago District

District name disambiguation pages